Cucumella is a genus of sea cucumbers belonging to the monotypic family Cucumellidae.

The species of this genus are found in South Africa and western Australia.

Species:
Cucumella triperforata 
Cucumella triplex

References

Dendrochirotida
Holothuroidea genera